Silvia Pinal Hidalgo (born 12 September 1931) is a Mexican actress. She began her career in the theater, venturing into cinema in 1949. She is one of Mexico's greatest female stars, one of the last surviving major stars from the Golden Age of Mexican cinema and is part of the Golden Age of Hollywood for her film Shark! (1969). Her film work and popularity in her native country led her to work in Europe (Spain and Italy). Pinal achieved international recognition by starring in a famous film trilogy by director Luis Buñuel: Viridiana (1961), El ángel exterminador (1962) and Simón del Desierto (1965).

In addition to her film career, she has excelled in other areas. She pioneered musical theatre in Mexico, ventured into television, and held some political office charges.

Early life
Silvia Pinal Hidalgo was born in Guaymas, Sonora, Mexico, on 12 September 1931. Her parents were María Luisa Hidalgo Aguilar and Moisés Pasquel. Pasquel was an orchestra conductor at the Mexican radio station XEW. Pinal's mother became pregnant with Pasquel when she was only 15 years old. Her father did not recognize her, and Pinal did not know him until she was 11.<ref>TVyNovelas México: Silvia Pinal presents her autobiographic book]</ref> On the part of her biological father, Pinal had three more brothers: Eugenio, Moisés, and Virginia. However, Pinal never spent time with the Pasquel family. Pinal spent her first years behind the counter of a seafood restaurant near the XEW, where her mother worked. When Pinal was five years old, her mother married Luis G. Pinal, whom they called "El Caballero Pinal", a journalist, military man, and politician twenty years older than her. Pinal adopted Silvia as his daughter; in later interviews, she asserted him as her only father. Mr. Pinal had three more daughters from a previous marriage: Mercedes, Beatriz, and Eugenia. Her adoptive father held several public positions in Mexico. He was municipal president of Tequisquiapan, Querétaro. The family lived in several cities in Mexico as Querétaro, Acapulco, Monterrey, Chilpancingo, Cuernavaca and Puebla, and finally settled in Mexico City.

Pinal has been fascinated by show business since she was a child. In addition to film and music, she liked to write and recite poems. She studied first at Pestalozzi College in Cuernavaca and then at the Washington Institute in Mexico City. Despite her artistic aspirations, her father conditioned her to study "something useful", so she learned typing. At age 14, she started working at Kodak as a secretary.

Pinal wanted to study opera. She began to prepare, taking classes with a private teacher and then with Professor Reyes Retana. Her first step towards fame occurred when she was invited to participate in a beauty pageant. In this contest, Pinal obtained the title of Student Princess of Mexico. At her coronation, she met the actors Rubén Rojo and Manolo Fábregas, with whom she became close friends.  While studying bel canto, Pinal went to work as a secretary in the pharmaceutical laboratories of Carlos Stein. At the music academy, Pinal auditioned for a role in the opera La Traviata. However, this hearing was a failure. Then her teacher encouraged her to take acting courses at the Instituto Nacional de Bellas Artes. In that academy, she was a classmate of figures such as Carlos Pellicer, Salvador Novo and Xavier Villaurrutia. She debuted as an extra in a performance of A Midsummer Night's Dream by William Shakespeare.

Career

Beginning
Pinal continued working in the pharmaceutical products firm in her advertising department. Knowing that she was studying acting, her boss allowed her to participate in recording some radio comedies in the XEQ. She debuted in the comedy Dos pesos la dejada.

At the radio station, she met some publicists who invited her to be part of an experimental company. She made her debut in that company with a role in the play Los Caprichos de Goya. The director of this work was the Mexican actor and director of Cuban origin Rafael Banquells, with whom Pinal began an employment relationship and a close friendship that led to romance. Rafael Banquells got the master Carlos Laverne to allow them to use the Ideal Theater of Mexico City for their productions. Laverne chose Pinal to participate in a montage with the company of the Ideal Theater, directed by the Spanish actress Isabelita Blanch. The work was called Nuestra Natacha. Pinal acted in numerous works for this company. Her first star work was Un sueño de cristal.

Film
Just fifteen days after she debuted in the theater, Pinal made her debut in the cinema with a brief role in Bamba (1949), starring Carmen Montejo and directed by Miguel Contreras Torres. Contreras Torres had seen her work at the Ideal Theatre and invited her to participate in the project. Contreras Torres was a tough and strict director who made Pinal suffer for her inexperience. Eventually, that same year, she performed in the film El pecado de Laura, directed by Julián Soler and starring Meche Barba. In that film, she worked for the first time in cinema with Rafael Banquells, who was already her husband at that time. Immediately she made another small role in the film Escuela para casadas, by Miguel Zacarías. Pinal met and worked for the first time with the popular actor and singer Pedro Infante in the film La mujer que yo perdí. The actor and comedian Cantinflas (her wedding godfather) chose Pinal as his co-star in The Doorman (1950), which was a massive step for the young and new actress. But her first solid step towards popularity was her participation in the comedy El rey del barrio (1949), where she formed a great comedic pair with Germán Valdés "Tin-Tán", directed by Gilberto Martínez Solares. Pinal and Tin Tán acted together in two more films: La marca del zorrillo (1950) and Me traes de un ala  (1952).
Pinal participated in minor roles in several more films.

Pinal received her first significant recognition, her first Silver Ariel Award as a co-starring actress, for her performance in the film Un rincón cerca del cielo (1952), where she worked again with Pedro Infante. In 1952, she performed with Joaquín Pardavé in the comedies Doña Mariquita de mi corazón and El casto Susano.

In 1953, Pinal signed a contract with the FILMEX studios of Gregorio Walerstein, who gave her first stellar works in the films Reventa de esclavas (1953) and Yo soy muy macho (1953). In that same year, she did her first musical work with the film Mis tres viudas alegres, where she shared credits with Lilia del Valle and the Cuban rumbera Amalia Aguilar. The film's success led the three actresses to star, that same year, in the comedy Las cariñosas. In that same year, she acted with Libertad Lamarque in Si volvieras a mí.

Pinal achieved success and recognition in 1954 after participating in the film Un extraño en la escalera, directed by Tulio Demicheli, and starring opposite Arturo de Córdova. De Córdova wanted as his co-stars the Italian actress Gina Lollobrigida or the Cuban rumbera Rosa Carmina, because he distrusted Pinal due to her youth. With the support of the producer Gregorio Walerstein, Pinal made a change of image, highlighting her sex appeal, which helped her to be approved by De Cordova for the film. The film was filmed in Havana, Cuba, and it was a remarkable blockbuster, which consecrates Pinal as the first figure in the cinema.

Another director who knew how to make the most of Pinal's histrionic abilities was Alberto Gout. Under the baton of Gout, Pinal made the film La sospechosa (1954). Another great movie in which Pinal participates is Historia de un abrigo de mink (1954), an episodic film in that Pinal co-stars with the actresses María Elena Marqués, Columba Domínguez and Irasema Dilián. With Tito Davison as director, Pinal also filmed the Mexican-Spanish-Chilean co-production Cabo de Hornos (1955), along with the actor Jorge Mistral. Pinal worked again with Pedro Infante as his co-star in the famous comedy El inocente (1955).

Pinal starred in several films by Tulio Demicheli. Among the most outstanding is Locura pasional (1955), which would bring her first Silver Ariel award as best actress. The second was thanks to her role in the film La dulce enemiga (1957), directed by Tito Davison.
In 1956, Pinal starred in the film Una cita de amor (1956), where she worked for the first and only time under the direction of the director Emilio Fernández.

The popularity and success of Pinal in Mexico opened the doors for her to work in Europe. following the advice of Tulio Demicheli. Her first work in the Old Continent is in the Spanish-Mexican co-production Las locuras de Bárbara (1958), directed by Demicheli. From the hand of Demicheli Silvia starred in Spain the musical film Charleston.

Given the success of her films in Europe, Pinal  was invited to work in Italy, where she also served as producer of the film Uomini e Nobiluomini (1959), in which she starred next to Vittorio de Sica and Elke Sommer.

Under the direction of José María Forqué, Pinal starred in Spain in the film Maribel y la extraña familia (1960). In 1961 she filmed the Spanish musical film Adiós, Mimí Pompom, next to Fernando Fernán Gómez.

Pinal achieved international acclaim through a trilogy of films that marked the end of the Mexican era of the Spanish filmmaker Luis Buñuel. Pinal had her first contact with Buñuel through Mexican actor Ernesto Alonso, with the firm intention of starring in the film version of the novel Tristana. However, the tiny commercial success of Buñuel's films prevented the producers from financing the project, which ended up collapsing (Buñuel filmed the film years later in Spain with Catherine Deneuve).

Years later, Pinal, with the help of her second husband, producer Gustavo Alatriste, looked for Buñuel in Spain and convinced him to film Viridiana (1961). This, without a doubt, is her most famous film. She was co-starred by Francisco Rabal and Fernando Rey and was the winner of the Palme d'Or at the prestigious Cannes Film Festival. Despite the success and prestige enjoyed by the film, it was rejected by the Spanish censorship and the Vatican at the time, accusing it of blasphemy. The Spanish government ordered its destruction. The film was saved through the intervention of Pinal, who fled with a copy to Mexico. In Mexico, Vatican censorship also resonated. However, with the help of Salvador Novo, the film premiered in some rooms.

Her second film with Buñuel was El ángel exterminador (1962), in which Pinal starred with a choral cast. The film also received critical acclaim worldwide. In 2004, the New York Times recognized it among the best films of all time.

Her third and last project with Buñuel was Simón del desierto (1964). The film, misrepresented as a medium-length film, was initially conceived as an episodic film. Pinal and Gustavo Alatriste looked for Federico Fellini to direct a second episode, but Fellini accepted with the condition that his wife, Giulietta Masina, starred in it. Jules Dassin wwas then sought, who likewise took on the condition that it was starred by his wife, Melina Mercouri. Pinal also rejected this request. The idea was that Pinal starred in all the film episodes, so the project ended up filming only with Buñuel. In the film, Pinal also made the first nude appearance of her career, something still rare in Mexican cinema and the first naked scenes of Buñuel's cinema.

Pinal was also on the verge of starring with Buñuel in the film Diary of a Chambermaid in France. Pinal learned French and was willing to charge nothing for her participation. However, the French producer Serge Silberman ended up choosing Jeanne Moreau.  Even so, Pinal (along with Lilia Prado), the actress with whom Buñuel worked the most, made three classic films. Pinal was also going to shoot with Buñuel in Spain on Divinas palabras, but copyrights had problems. Years later, Pinal finally did it in Mexico with another director.

After her work with Buñuel, Pinal returned to the cinema with the comedy Buenas noches, Año Nuevo (1965), where she alternated with Ricardo Montalbán. In 1966 she made the mythical film La soldadera, directed by José Bolaños and inspired by the events of the Mexican Revolution. That same year, she participated in the Mexican-Brazilian co-production Juego peligroso, directed by Luis Alcoriza and based on a script by Gabriel García Márquez. She also appeared in the Franco-Italian-Mexican co-production La bataille de san sebastian, along with Anthony Quinn and Charles Bronson. In 1967 Pinal films Shark!, with Burt Reynolds and directed by Samuel Fuller, making this the only Hollywood production in which Pinal has appeared.
Pinal achieved a huge blockbuster with the film María Isabel (1968), based on a popular cartoon by Yolanda Vargas Dulché.

Between the late 1960s and early 1970s, Pinal mainly made comic films directed by the filmmaker René Cardona Jr. In 1976, Pinal starred in Las mariposas disecadas, a thriller of psychological suspense. In 1977 she finally starred in the controversial film Divinas palabras (1977), directed by Juan Ibáñez, a film where she made an integral nude scene.

At the end of the seventies and the beginning of the eighties, Pinal filmed some films in Spain, Italy and Argentina as part of a project by Televisa to unify the Spanish and Latin American markets.

After ten years of absence from the cinema, Pinal returned in 1992 with the tape Modelo antiguo, directed by Raúl Araiza. The decline of Mexican cinema and the activity of Pinal on television and other media (such as politics) made her practically withdraw from the big screen. In recent years, her film appearances have been limited to films Ya no los hacen como antes (2002) and a brief special appearance in Tercera llamada (2013).

Stage
Pinal made her debut at the theater in the Instituto Nacional de Bellas Artes. Eventually, she did experimental plays, to then work at the Ideal Theater in Mexico City, in the Spanish actress Isabelita Blanch's company, where she was directed in numerous productions by Rafael Banquells.

Outside of this company, in 1950 participated in the play Celos del aire, with Manolo Fábregas and Carmen Montejo. That same year she represented Doña Inés in Don Juan Tenorio, next to Jorge Mistral. Of her most outstanding plays from the beginning of her career stand out The Madwoman of Chaillot, next to Prudencia Griffel and El cuadrante de la soledad, by José Revueltas, with sets by the artist Diego Rivera. In 1954, Pinal participated in the play La Sed with Ernesto Alonso and the Argentinean actor Pedro López Lagar. In 1955 she obtained recognition in the theater scene in the assembly of Anna Christie, along with Wolf Ruvinskis. In 1957 Pinal staged the play Desnúdate, Lucrecia, in Chile, next to Jorge Mistral, who eventually starred in the cinema in Mexico.

In 1958, Pinal was responsible for producing in Mexico the first Musical comedy, Bells Are Ringing, directed by Luis de Llano Palmer. For this work, Pinal had the offer to work on Broadway with the manager of Judy Holliday, but Pinal refused to cut her career in Mexico.

In 1964 she made the Mexican version of the musical Irma La Douce, alongside Julio Alemán and directed by Enrique Rambal. José Luis Ibáñez will end up becoming her head theater director. Under the baton of Ibañez, Pinal starred in the work Vidas privadas. One of her most notable works in musical comedy was the Mexican version of Mame, a successful Broadway musical, which, thanks to her success, Pinal rode three times (1972, 1985 and 1989). In 1976 he also starred in the musical Annie Get Your Gun.

In 1977, to commemorate her twenty-five-year career, Pinal set up her cabaret show entitled ¡Felicidades Silvia!. The show was presented with great success, first at the nightclub El Patio, and then at the Teatro de la Ciudad in Mexico City.

In 1978, she starred in the musical Plaza Suite. Her daughter Viridiana's death truncated the theatrical project Agnes of God, which starred together in 1982. In 1983, Pinal starred in and produced the Mexican montage of the work La señorita de Tacna, based on the work of Mario Vargas Llosa. In 1985, while serving as First Lady of the state of Tlaxcala, Pinal remodelled the Xicohténcatl Theater, which reopened with the assembly The memories of the Divine Sarah. In 1986, Pinal starred in the work Anna Karenina, which despite the success obtained, was not to the liking of the actress, and the assembly only reached 100 performances.

In 1988, in association with Margarita López Portillo, Pinal acquired the Cine Estadio, located in Colonia Roma in Mexico City, transforming it into its theatrical venue, the Silvia Pinal Theater, a space dedicated mainly to musical comedy. Pinal was free to set up her productions.  The theater was inaugurated in 1989 with the third representation of the musical Mame, with Pinal at the head of the cast.

In 1992, Pinal acquired the former Cine Versalles, located in Colonia Juárez in Mexico City and turned it into his second theater, the Diego Rivera Theater. The Diego Rivera Theater was inaugurated in 1991 with the assembly Lettice and Lovage.

In 1996, Pinal returned to the musical theater with the second Mexican version of Hello, Dolly!, opposite Ignacio López Tarso. Pinal's last work in her last theater was Gypsy (1998), starring alongside her daughter, the singer Alejandra Guzmán.

As a producer, she was responsible for making the Mexican versions of the musicals A Chorus Line (1989), Cats (1991) and La Cage aux Folles (1992). Unfortunately, several problems caused Pinal to close the Silvia Pinal Theater, which stopped functioning in 2000 to become a religious temple.

Pinal returned to the theater in 2002 with the play Debiera haber obispas. In recent dates she has also participated in productions such as Adorables enemigas (2008) and Amor, dolor y lo que puesto (2012). In 2014, the Diego Rivera Theater changed its name to become the new Silvia Pinal Theatre.

Television
Pinal dabbled in television since its appearance in Mexico in the early 1950s. In 1952, she participated in her television show titled Con los brazos abiertos. Eventually, she participated in numerous telecasts produced by Luis de Llano Palmer. That's where Pinal first introduced the use of playback on Mexican television.

In the mid-sixties, Pinal staged her comic-musical show on Televisa, Los especiales de Silvia Pinal. When Silvia married the actor and singer Enrique Guzmán, both produced and starred in the variety show Silvia y Enrique (a comedy-musical program in the style of The Sonny & Cher Comedy Hour), which presented for four years (1968–1972) with great success. Once separated from Guzmán, Silvia continued with her variety show titled ¡Ahora Silvia!!.In 1985, she became a producer and presenter of Mujer, casos de la vida real TV show. Initially, the show was created to respond to cases and needs of the public and focused on locating victims of the 1985 earthquake in Mexico City. Over time, the show evolved to present current issues and daily life, including domestic violence, legal issues and public health. This production was a success and lasted more than 20 years, transmitting in Mexico, Spain, Italy and several countries in Latin America. The program was cancelled in 2007.

In 2009 Pinal also participated in a chapter of the series Mujeres asesinas.

In 1968, Pinal made his debut in telenovelas with the historical telenovela Los caudillos, inspired by the War of Independence of Mexico. Ernesto Alonso produced the telenovela. Her second foray into the genre was with the telenovela ¿Quién? (1973), produced by Guillermo Diazayas and based on a cartoon by Yolanda Vargas Dulché.

Eventually, Pinal decided to produce her telenovelas; her first hit was Mañana es primavera (1982), the last acting work of her daughter Viridiana, before dying. In 1985 he also produced and starred in Eclipse.

Her last works in television have been in special participation in various telenovelas and television series. The most relevant ones are Carita de ángel (2000), in which she went on to replace the actress Libertad Lamarque, who at the time of her death left her character unfinished in this childhood melodrama), Fuego en la sangre (2008), Soy tu dueña (2010) and Mi marido tiene familia (2017).

In addition to the telenovelas mentioned above she starred, Pinal also produced the melodramas Cuando los hijos van (1983) and Tiempo de amar (1987).

Politics
Pinal dabbled in the world of politics due to her fourth marriage with the politician Tulio Hernández Gómez, governor of the State of Tlaxcala. Between 1981 and 1987, Pinal was the First Lady of that state. Eventually, she became a member of the Institutional Revolutionary Party and was elected federal deputy in 1991. Later, she became a senator and member of the Asamblea de Representantes del Federal District. In these positions, Pinal had some achievements. Among the most outstanding are to achieve that the Cinematographic Law contemplate the right of an interpreter, worked on the Law of Condominiums and the Law of Tourism, did tasks in favour of ecology, promoted the dissemination of theater books and fought for the Ministry of Finance to lower taxes on the theater.

Since the fifties, Pinal actively participated in trade union movements of the actors of his country. She was part of the group "Rosa Mexicano", founded by Dolores del Río. Between 1988 and 1995, Pinal became a leader of the National Association of Interpreters (A.N.D.I.) of Mexico.

Pinal had problems with justice in the year 2000 due to problems in her management as leader of the Association of Theater Producers (Protea) in the early 1990s. For this reason, the actress lived in Miami, United States, for some time.[3] After eleven months, the actress was declared innocent and returned to her country.

Between 2010 and 2014, Pinal served as General Secretary of the Screen Actors Guild of México (ANDA) of Mexico.

To protect the mature actors, she became the founder of the Asociación Rafael Banquells, in charge of providing non-profit help to the interpreters. As president of the association, Pinal delivers the Bravo Awards to the highlights in music, film, theater, radio, television, dubbing and commercial realization during the year. The awards have been given annually since 1991.

Personal life

Pinal has been married four times. Her first marriage was with the actor and director Rafael Banquells, who was her first formal boyfriend. Pinal married Banquells in 1947. Pinal acknowledges that her marriage at such an early age was partly due to escape from her father's repression: "I changed my father for a softer one that stimulated me in my career." The couple divorced in 1952, a year after the birth of their daughter, Sylvia Pasquel, who later had an outstanding career as an actress.

Her second marriage was with the businessman and film producer Gustavo Alatriste. Pinal has revealed on numerous occasions that Alatriste was the love of her life, a husband with whom she could have stayed forever. Pinal met Alatriste at a meeting at Ernesto Alonso's house when he was about to divorce the actress Ariadne Welter. It was thanks to Alatriste that Pinal was able to make her film projects with Luis Buñuel. The marriage ended in 1967 due to Alatriste's infidelities and business problems between the couple. From her relationship with Alatriste, she had a daughter, actress Viridiana Alatriste (1963-1982). Unfortunately, Viridiana died tragically in a car accident in Mexico City in 1982, only 19 years old.

Her third marriage was with Rock and roll's famous singer and idol Enrique Guzmán. Pinal and Guzmán met when he came as a guest on Pinal's television show ¡Ahora Silvia! Pinal and Guzmán were married in 1967 despite some resistance from Pinal being 11 years older than her husband. Their marriage lasted nine years. They worked together and procreated two children: the famous singer Alejandra Guzmán (born in 1968) and the musician and composer Luis Enrique Guzmán (born in 1970).

Her last marriage was with the politician and then governor of the state of Tlaxcala, Tulio Hernández Gómez. The couple married in 1982. It was through Hernández that Pinal entered the world of politics. Pinal and Hernandez divorced in 1995.

In addition to her marriages, at various times in her life, Pinal held multiple romances. In 1954, when filming Un extraño en la escalera, Pinal fell in love with her co-star, Arturo de Córdova.[5] Others of her romances were with the Mexican businessman Emilio Azcárraga Milmo,[6] the Egyptian actor Omar Sharif[7] and the American businessman Conrad Nicholson Hilton, Jr.

With time, Pinal has become the head of one of Latin America's most famous artistic dynasties. Her daughters Sylvia and Viridiana followed in her footsteps as an actress. Alejandra, the youngest of her daughters, is one of Mexico's most popular singers. Alejandra's daughter Frida Sofía is also a model living in Miami, Fl. In addition, her granddaughter Stephanie Salas (daughter of Sylvia) has also forged a career as an actress and singer. Stephanie's daughters, Michelle Salas and Camila Valero are both models and actresses.

Awards and honors
 In 1954, the beer Corona sent an advertisement that included a song in which they mentioned Pinal next to the Italian divas' Gina Lollobrigida, Silvana Mangano and Silvana Pampanini.
 In 1955, Pinal was immortalized in a portrait by the famous painter Diego Rivera, who occupies a special place in the Pinal residence in Mexico City.
 In addition to Rivera, Pinal has also been painted by other artists such as Oswaldo Guayasamín, Mario Chávez Marión, Sylvia Pardo and General Ignacio Beteta Quintana.
 In 1978, Pinal posed naked in a photo shoot for the Spanish magazine Interviú.
 Pinal is represented as one of the Seven Muses of Art in a stained glass window of Xicohténcatl Theatre in Tlaxcala.
 When her daughter Alejandra Guzmán launched as a singer in 1988, she dedicated a controversial song to her mother titled "Bye Mama" and included it in her debut album.
 In 2002, Pinal was recognized when a statue in her honour was in Mexico City. Renowned sculptor Ricardo Ponzanelli did the work.
 In 2006, Pinal was awarded in Spain with the Orden de Isabel la Católica in the grade of Commander for her cultural contribution to the world of cinema.
 In 2013, Pinal was honoured by the Wax Museum of Mexico City for unveiling a figure in her honour.
 In 2015, Pinal published her autobiographical book entitled Esta soy yo.
 In 2016, the Academy of Motion Picture Arts and Sciences of Hollywood chose Pinal as one of its members to recognize her long career and contribution to the international film industry.
 At some point, Matt Casella, a headhunter for DreamWorks, looked for Pinal to make a biographical series about her life. However, the project still needs to materialize.
 In 2019, Televisa produced a television series based on Pinal's life. The series is titled Silvia Pinal, frente a ti, and Mexican actress Itatí Cantoral portrays Pinal.

Filmography

Films

Television
 Relatos macabrones (2020) as Doña Teresa
 Juntos el corazón nunca se equivoca (2019) as Doña Imelda Sierra Vda. de Corcega 
 Silvia Pinal, frente a ti (2019) as Herself
 Mi marido tiene familia (2017–2019) as Doña Imelda Sierra Vda. de Córcega
 La tempestad (2013) as Soraya Alcántara
 Un refugio para el amor (2012) as Herself 
 Una familia con suerte (2011) as Herself
 Soy tu dueña (2010) as Isabel Rangel Vda. de Dorantes
 Mañana es para siempre (2009) as Herself 
 Fuego en la sangre (2008) as Santa Margarita Lorenza Vda. de Gómez
 Una familia de diez (2007-2019) as Herself 
 Amor sin maquillaje (2007) as Herself 
 Aventuras en el tiempo (2001) as Silvia
 Carita de ángel (2000-2001) as Mother Lucía
 El privilegio de amar (1998)
 Lazos de amor (1995) as Herself
 Mujer, casos de la vida real (1986-2007) as Host 
 Eclipse (1984)
 Mañana es primavera (1983) as Amanda González de Serrano
 Y ahora, ¿qué? (1980)
 ¿Quién? (1973)
 Los caudillos (1968) as Jimena
 Al rojo vivoStage

Stage (producer)
 A Chorus Line (1989)
 Cats (1991)
 La Cage aux Folles'' (1993)

References

Bibliography

External links

 Silvia Pinal at the telenovela database
 
  Silvia Pinal at the cinema of Mexico site of the ITESM
  Silvia Pinal at the Mexican Academy of Film

1931 births
Living people
Pinal family
Mexican telenovela actresses
Mexican television actresses
Mexican film actresses
Mexican stage actresses
Mexican telenovela producers
Mexican television presenters
Mexican television talk show hosts
Best Supporting Actress Ariel Award winners
Golden Age of Mexican cinema
Golden Ariel Award winners
Ariel Award winners
20th-century Mexican actresses
21st-century Mexican actresses
Commanders of the Order of Isabella the Catholic
Institutional Revolutionary Party politicians
Members of the Chamber of Deputies (Mexico)
Members of the Senate of the Republic (Mexico)
Women members of the Senate of the Republic (Mexico)
Mexican actor-politicians
People from Guaymas
Women members of the Chamber of Deputies (Mexico)
Women television producers
Mexican women television presenters